Tess Frazer is an American actress from New York City. She is best known for starring alongside Michelle Dockery, Merritt Wever, and Jeff Daniels when playing Callie Dunne in the Emmy Award winning Netflix western TV miniseries Godless.

Early life and education

A native New Yorker born into a family of actors, Tess has performed on stage in New York and beyond since she was a young child. Frazer is a graduate of the Fiorello H. LaGuardia High School of Music & Art and Performing Arts and trained at Maggie Flanigan Studio and Circle in the Square Theatre. She has studied and performed improv comedy at IO Theater in Chicago, Illinois, as well as The PIT, Magnet, and UCB theaters in New York City.

Theatre 
Tess originated the role of Lorna in the world premiere of award-winning playwright Tracy Letts’s Mary Page Marlowe at the renowned Steppenwolf Theatre in Chicago. Directed by Tony Award-winning director Anna D. Shapiro, the play opened in April of 2016 to rave reviews. Tess later reprised her role in the recent revival at Second Stage Theater in New York City in the summer of 2018, directed by Lila Neugebauer.

Screen 
Frazer made her feature debut in the 2015 television movie Fan Girl opposite Meg Ryan and Kiernan Shipka playing Claire Bovary, a social media super-star who is as popular as she is kind. Tess next appeared alongside Jesse Eisenberg as Jane, a 1930's Hollywood secretary to Steve Carell in Woody Allen’s Cafe Society.

Frazer was a series regular in the 2017 Netflix western limited series Godless, playing Callie Dunne, a former prostitute turned schoolteacher, starring alongside Michelle Dockery, Merritt Weaver and Jeff Daniels. Tess also appears opposite Emily Mortimer in the romantic comedy/heist film Write When You Get Work as Ashley Spradlin, a trusted and caring school administrator.

Filmography

TV & film

Theater

References

External links
 Steppenwolf.org
  maggieflaniganstudio.com
 

Living people
21st-century English actresses
English film actresses
English television actresses
1991 births